Gerard Granollers and Jordi Samper-Montaña were the defending champions, but they lost in the final to Dino Marcan and Antonio Šančić, 1–6, 6–7(3–7).

Seeds

Draw

Draw

References
 Main Draw

Morocco - Kenitra - Doubles
2014 Doubles
Kenitra - Doubles